Sidalcea candida, the white checkerbloom, prairie mallow or white checkermallow, is a wildflower found from Nevada to Wyoming and south to the southern part of New Mexico. The plant grows to three feet, and is also known as wild hollyhock. Its flowers are about one inch wide with five petals. It is found mostly in mountain meadows and along streams. It flowers between June and September.

References

candida
Flora of the Great Basin
Flora of the Western United States
Flora without expected TNC conservation status